The 2021 Platu 25 World Championships were held from 22 to 28 August 2021 in Nida, Lithuania.

This was the first sailing world championships approved by World Sailing held in Lithuania.

Medal summary

Winners of individual stages

Incidents 
 24th August:  Tadas Žižys (boat Pandora) protested against  Ivan Kolobov (boat La Moreneta). Protest dismissed.
 25th August: due strong winds multiple boats got damaged while in a race: few boats damaged their sails, Lithuanian boat Matahambre dismasted, Latvian boat RA Evolution lost rudder.
 26th August: due weak wind competition was cancelled for the day. Four races planned for next day.
 27th August:  Tomas Jurgelevičius (boat Hegelmann) protested against  Andrejs Buls (boat Bailarina). Protest upheld and Bailarina crew disqualified from race 9.
 28th August: due weak wind competition was cancelled for the final day.

References

External links 
 Official website

Platu 25 World Championships
Platu 25 World Championships
Sailing competitions in Lithuania
2021 in Lithuanian sport
Platu 25
Nida, Lithuania